The Cornwall Emards were a team in the Quebec Senior Football League in the 1950s. In 1958 they lost to the Verdun Shamcats in the league championship.

Canadian football teams in Ontario
Defunct Canadian football teams
Sport in Cornwall, Ontario